"One of These Nights" is a song written by Don Henley and Glenn Frey and recorded by the American rock band Eagles. The title track from their One of These Nights album, the song became their second single to top the Billboard Hot 100 chart after "Best of My Love" and also helped propel the album to number one. The single version was shortened from the album version of the song, removing most of the song's intro and most of its fade-out, as well.  Henley is lead vocalist on the verses, while Randy Meisner sings high harmony on the refrain. The song features a guitar solo by Don Felder that is "composed of blues-based licks and sustained string bends using an unusually meaty distortion tone."

Background
The song was a conscious attempt by the band to write something different from a country-rock and ballad-type song. Don Henley said: "We like to be a nice little country-rock band from Los Angeles ... about half the time."  He added: "We wanted to get away from the ballad syndrome with "One of These Nights." With Don Felder in the band now, we can really rock." Frey said that they "wanted 'One of These Nights' to have a lot of teeth, a lot of bite—a nasty track with pretty vocals."

The writing was influenced by R&B music and disco; according to Frey, he was listening to Spinners and Al Green records when he started writing the song. Frey started the writing process by composing the music, and Henley then started with the lyrics.  Frey said: "I just went over to the piano and I started playing this little minor descending progression, and he comes over and goes, 'One of these nights'." After that, Frey said: "What usually happens is when we get the thing fused together, he gets involved in the music and I get involved in the lyrics." While they were recording the album in Miami, the band also shared a studio with the Bee Gees, and according to Henley, the "four-on-the-floor" bass-drum pattern is a nod to disco.

In the liner notes of The Very Best Of, Frey had this to say about the song:

Frey also said that the song is about putting things off. "We've all said, 'One of these nights I'm gonna do something -- get that girl, make that money, find that house.' We all have our dreams – a vision we hope will come true someday. When that 'someday' will come is up to each of us."

On the recording, Frey said: "We cut the basic track in Miami in December at Criteria Studios. We took it to L.A., put all the drone guitars and Felder's solo on in L.A., and went back to Miami to put the vocals on in March."

The B-side, "Visions", features lead vocals by guitarist Don Felder, the only Eagles song to do so.

Reception
Billboard praised the "strong harmonies" and said that "One of These Nights" was similar to the Eagles' earlier song "Witchy Woman" at times.  Cash Box said it had "a fresh, relaxed sound which should catapult the group to the top."  Ultimate Classic Rock critic Sterling Whitaker rated it as the Eagles 6th most underrated song, praising Don Felder's "blazing" electric guitar solo.

Personnel
Don Henley – lead vocals, drums
Glenn Frey – piano, backing vocals
Don Felder – lead guitar, rhythm guitar
Randy Meisner – bass guitar, backing vocals
Bernie Leadon – rhythm guitar, backing vocals

Charts

Weekly charts

Year-end charts

All-time charts

Certifications

References

1975 singles
Disco songs
Eagles (band) songs
Billboard Hot 100 number-one singles
Cashbox number-one singles
Songs written by Glenn Frey
Songs written by Don Henley
Asylum Records singles
Song recordings produced by Bill Szymczyk
1975 songs